"Imposible" is a song by Puerto Rican singers Luis Fonsi and Ozuna, released on October 19, 2018 through Universal Music Latin Entertainment. The song topped the charts in Chile and reached the top 10 in: Argentina, Bolivia, Panama and Spain.

Background
Fonsi wrote a song with "a lot of feeling" and wanted a voice with a "perfect balance between urban and melodic", so he chose Ozuna. Fonsi stated that he wished to collaborate with Ozuna because he is "incredibly talented, has great vocals and great writing".

Composition
The song is a "romantic urban tune" dedicated to women, from the point of view of a man. HotNewHipHop stated the track has the sound and potential to be a "'Despacito type single". El Mundo called the song a ballad mixed with reggaeton and similar to Fonsi's other "songs of this style that were characterized by their romantic lyrics and deep phrases".

Music video
The music video was directed by Carlos Perez and filmed at a train station in Miami in September 2018, with Fonsi confirming this on Instagram.

Charts

Weekly charts

Year-end charts

Certifications

See also
 List of Billboard Argentina Hot 100 top-ten singles in 2019
List of Billboard number-one Latin songs of 2019

References

2018 singles
2018 songs
Luis Fonsi songs
Ozuna (singer) songs
Songs written by Luis Fonsi
Songs written by Ozuna (singer)
Songs written by Andrés Torres (producer)
Song recordings produced by Andrés Torres (producer)
Songs written by Mauricio Rengifo